Lefranc is a surname. Notable people with the surname include:

Christelle Lefranc (born 1980), French fashion model from Paris, France
Jean Georges Lefranc de Pompignan (1715–1790), French clergyman and younger brother of Jean-Jacques
Jean-Jacques Lefranc, Marquis de Pompignan (1709–1784), French jurist, man of letters and gardener
Jean-Marc Lefranc (born 1947), member of the National Assembly of France
Victor Lefranc (1809–1883), French lawyer and politician, moderated republican, Minister of Agriculture and Trade, then Interior Minister